Haemaphlebia is a genus of moths of the family Noctuidae. The genus was erected by George Hampson in 1910.

Species
Haemaphlebia atripalpis Hampson, 1910 Ghana, Liberia, Nigeria, Uganda
Haemaphlebia caliginosa Hacker, 2019 Ivory Coast
Haemaphlebia fasciolata Hacker, 2019 Burkina Faso, Nigeria, Somalia
Haemaphlebia fiebigiana Hacker & Stadie, 2019 Uganda
Haemaphlebia gola Hacker, 2019 Liberia
Haemaphlebia lanceolata Hacker, 2019 Burkina Faso
Haemaphlebia pallidifusca Hacker, 2019 Guinea, Tanzania

References

External links

Acontiinae